Eurysacca chili is a moth in the family Gelechiidae. It was described by Povolný in 1967. It is found in Chile.

References

Eurysacca
Moths described in 1967
Endemic fauna of Chile